Margaret Nagle (born January 12, 1969) is a screenwriter, television producer and human rights activist. She has been nominated for two Emmy Awards and won three Writers Guild of America Awards. Nagle began her undergraduate work at UC Berkeley while still in high school attending both simultaneously. She received her bachelor's degree at Northwestern University in Evanston, Illinois.

Her first script, HBO's Warm Springs received a record-breaking 16 Emmy nominations and won five Emmys in 2005, including the Emmy Award for Best Television Movie. It also won the 2006 Writers Guild of America Award for Long Form Original Screenplay. Her screenplay for the 2014 film "The Good Lie" received The Paul Selvin Award from the Writers Guild of America. Nagle also received a 2011 Writer's Guild Award for her work on Boardwalk Empire.

She received the 2014 Media Access Award from the Writers Guild of America for "doubling the number" of people on network TV with disabilities. Nagle has been raising money for Humanitarian Aid for South Sudan by appearing at screenings of The Good Lie on behalf of Concern, UNICEF, RefugePoint and other organizations.

Career
Nagle wrote the script for The Good Lie, released in 2014, a movie about the Lost Boys of Sudan,  It premiered at 2014 Toronto Film Festival where it received the longest standing ovation in the history of the festival. It was released in 2014 by Warner Brothers. The Good Lie received an A+ rating from CinemaScore one of a handful of films ever to receive that high a rating.

Nagle received the prestigious 2015 Paul Selvin Award from the Writers Guild of America for The Good Lie. The award is given each year to the WGA member whose script best embodies the spirit of the constitutional and civil rights and liberties that are indispensable to the survival of free writers everywhere and to which Selvin devoted his professional life. Nagle was nominated for Best Original Screenplay of a Feature Film for THE GOOD LIE at the 2015 NAACP AWARDS.  Through Thegoodliefund.org the movie has been raising money for humanitarian aid for South Sudan. The film is regularly shown on college campuses through The Enough Project.

Nagle received the 2015 Jonathan Daniels Award named for the slain civil rights worker who was working with MLK from the Monadnock International Film Festival celebrating the fusion of great artistic merit and social awareness. The Good Lie was nominated for the Humanitas Prize for 2016 for Best Screenplay of a Feature Film.

A former actress, Nagle appeared in My So-Called Life as beleaguered biology teacher Ms. Chavatal. Bruce Weber in his New York Times review of the show wrote, "Watch out for the faculty members, each astutely idiosyncratic. I especially liked the hopelessly perky science teacher, played by Margaret Nagle, whose style is to lead the class to answers they have no interest in giving: "An experiment must test a what? A hypothesis. And a hypothesis consists of several . . . ? Anybody?"

Nagle's very first film script, Warm Springs about FDR's dealing with polio was a critical success for HBO. It won the Emmy for Best Movie in 2006. It was also nominated for Best Television Movie by the Golden Globes. Nagle won the 2007 WGA Award for Best Screenplay of a Movie Made for Television for Warm Springs and was nominated for the Pen Award for Best Screenplay of a Television Movie as well as the 2007 Humanitas Prize.

Nagle wrote two episodes for Season One of HBO's Boardwalk Empire: "Broadway Limited" and "Anastasia". She was a supervising producer on season one and season two of the show. Boardwalk Empire Season One won Best TV Series at the Golden Globes in 2010. Her other work includes the Lifetime show Side Order of Life in 2007, for which she won a special award from The Academy of Television Arts and Sciences. She wrote a CBS 2009 television pilot, The Eastmans, a medical show centered around a complicated family of doctors.

Nagle wrote the 2014 pilot for American television of The Red Band Society for Fox with Amblin TV based on the Catalan TV series of the same name (Polseres vermelles). Her script for The Goree Girls, about the first all-female country western band that was started in a Texas prison, was produced in 2015 by Bron, Kristin Hahn and Jennifer Aniston.

Nagle is currently writing a script for Maven Pictures about the life of Clementine Churchill. She is also developing a series of Tom Wolfe's classic book, "Bonfire of the Vanities" with Chuck Lorre and Warner Brothers TV.

Personal
Nagle's paternal descent is Irish. Nagle is named after her great aunt, modern dance pioneer Margaret Newell H'Doubler. Nagle, who has a brother with a brain injury from a car accident, is actively involved in furthering rights and visibility for people with disabilities and is on the board of United Cerebral Palsy of Southern California. Nagle recently received the Media Access Award from the Writers Guild of America for through her work "doubling the number" of people on network TV with disabilities. Her acceptance speech at the 9 am award show was a highlight.

Awards/Nominations
Won 2015 Writers Guild of America Paul Selvin Award for The Good Lie.
Won 2015 Jonathan Daniels Award from the Monadnock International Film Festival for The Good Lie.
Won 2014 Writers Guild of America Evan Somers Media Access Award for body of work.
Won Writers Guild of America Award for Best New Show 2011 for Boardwalk Empire.
Won the Television Academy Honors 2007 award for One hour Series writing/producing for "Side Order of Life"along with Dick Wolf for "Law and Order"  and David Kelley for "Boston Legal."
Won the Writers Guild Award for Best Original Television Movie 2006 for Warm Springs.
Nominated for the Emmy Award for Best One Hour Series for Television 2011 for Boardwalk Empire.
Nominated for the Emmy Award for Best Writing of a Television Movie 2005 for Warm Springs.
Nominated for the Humanitas Award in 2006 for Warm Springs.
Nominated for the Pen Award 2006 for Best TV movie for Warm Springs.

References

External links
 

American film producers
American television writers
American television producers
American women television producers
Writers Guild of America Award winners
American screenwriters
Living people
American women television writers
1971 births
21st-century American women